The Canadian Film Awards were the leading Canadian cinema awards from 1949 until 1978. These honours were conducted annually, except in 1974 when a number of Quebec directors withdrew their participation and prompted a cancellation. In the 1970s they were also sometimes known as the Etrog Awards for sculptor Sorel Etrog, who designed the statuette.

The awards were succeeded by the Academy of Canadian Cinema's Genie Awards in 1980; beginning in 2013 the Academy merged the Genie Awards with its separate Gemini Awards program for television to create the contemporary Canadian Screen Awards.

History
The award was first established in 1949 by the Canadian Association for Adult Education, under a steering committee that included the National Film Board's James Beveridge, the Canadian Foundation's Walter Herbert, filmmaker F. R. Crawley, the National Gallery of Canada's Donald Buchanan and diplomat Graham McInnes. The initial jury consisted of Hye Bossin, managing editor of Canadian Film Weekly; M. Stein of Famous Players; CBC film critic Gerald Pratley; Moira Armour of the Toronto and Vancouver Film societies; and Ian MacNeill from CAAE. The Canadian Foundation and the Canadian Film Institute were also brought in as sponsors of the awards.

The first presentation was held on April 27, 1949 at the Little Elgin Theatre in Ottawa.

With only a handful of Canadian films released each year, they were generally a small affair. Unlike the eligibility rules for the contemporary Canadian Screen Awards, which are based on the film having already been screened theatrically in either commercial release or the film festival circuit, in the Canadian Film Awards era films, even if otherwise unreleased, were eligible for nominations or awards based solely on their submission to a dedicated Canadian Film Awards screening festival.

In 1957, The Globe and Mail columnist Ronald Johnson criticized the awards' publicity efforts, noting that even Bossin was not actually receiving the press releases and that many of the releases which were going out were being sent to journalists not involved in covering or reporting on film. The paper's film critic Jay Scott later described them as "honours given by presenters no one knew, to recipients no one recognized, to films no one had seen."

With very few feature films made in Canada at all prior to the 1960s, in some years no Film of the Year winner was named at all, with the awards for Best Short Film or Best Amateur Film instead constituting the highest honour given to a film that year. Even the award for Film of the Year, when presented at all, often also went to a short film. The awards were also almost totally dominated by the National Film Board, to the point that independent filmmakers sometimes alleged a systemic bias which was itself a contributing factor to the difficulty of building a sustainable commercial film industry in Canada. Particularly in the 1960s, television films were also eligible for the awards; in 1969, in fact, no theatrical films were entered into the awards at all, and the nominees and winners at the 21st Canadian Film Awards consisted almost entirely of television films. Despite the creation of the ACTRA Awards in 1972, the Canadian Film Awards continued to present selected "non-feature" awards, inclusive of television films, until the 1st Genie Awards in 1980. After launching the Genies, the Academy of Canadian Cinema and Television created the Bijou Awards, which were presented in 1981 as a new home for several award categories that were being dropped from the Genies, although the Bijous were never presented again after 1981, and instead the Gemini Awards were launched in 1986 to replace the ACTRAs as Canada's primary television awards.

A separate award for Best Feature Film was instituted in 1964. Acting awards were introduced in 1968, and then expanded into separate categories for lead and supporting performers in 1970.

In 1968, the consortium of organizations that presented the awards up to that point discontinued their involvement, and the awards were reorganized into their own independent organization with their own board of directors. A new bronze award statuette was designed by sculptor Sorel Etrog, and thereafter the award was often referred to as an Etrog, although the name of the ceremony itself remained the Canadian Film Awards. Two special awards, the John Grierson Award for outstanding contribution to Canadian cinema and the Wendy Michener Award for outstanding artistic achievement, were also added in later years.

Quebec crisis of the 1970s
In the 1970s, the organization frequently faced crises related to the francophone film industry in Quebec. This began in 1970, when filmmaker Jean Pierre Lefebvre threatened to withdraw his film Q-Bec My Love from the competition if the Ontario Censor Board did not withdraw its demand for the film to be edited. Several other filmmakers were also prepared to withdraw in solidarity, although provincial cabinet minister James Auld intervened to dissuade the board from insisting on the cuts.

In 1973, a number of Quebec filmmakers boycotted the 25th Canadian Film Awards, out of a perception that the organization had a systemic bias against francophone films. This protest resulted in the last-minute cancellation of the 1973 awards ceremony, with the winners announced only at a press conference, and the complete cancellation of the 1974 awards. When the awards returned in 1975, the eligibility period covered the entire two-year period since the previous ceremony in 1973; however, the awards committee revived the defunct Film of the Year category alongside the ongoing Best Feature Film award, so that two Best Pictures, one for each of 1974 and 1975, could be named. The 1973 awards were also criticized for the jury's choice of Slipstream as Best Feature Film over a field of four other much stronger nominees, with some writers later declaring that the film's victory, over enduring Canadian film classics such as Kamouraska and Réjeanne Padovani, essentially confirmed that the boycotting directors were correct in their beliefs.

Evolution into the Genie Awards
In the final years of the Canadian Film Awards, the dedicated festival was discontinued, and instead the eligible films were screened as part of the Festival of Festivals lineup after that event was launched in 1976, with the ceremony taking place at the end of the festival.

After 1978, the awards were taken over by the new Academy of Canadian Cinema and Television, and reorganized into the new Genie Awards. Despite the renaming, Etrog's statuette was initially retained as the design of the Genie statuettes. The Genie Awards continued to be presented until 2012, when the Academy merged them with its Gemini Awards program for television to create the contemporary Canadian Screen Awards.

When Academy publicist Maria Topalovich was preparing a history of the awards for publication in the early 1980s, she found that even the Academy itself had not received complete documentation of the awards' past winners and nominees in the takeover, and instead she had to undertake extensive archival research.

Awards ceremonies 
The following is a listing of all Canadian Film Awards Ceremonies.

References

Further reading

External links
Genie Awards site

Awards established in 1949
Awards disestablished in 1978
1949 establishments in Canada
1978 disestablishments in Canada